Thomas Peter Sjögren  (born June 8, 1968) is a retired Swedish professional ice hockey player. He scored six goals and nine assists at the 1988 World Junior Ice Hockey Championships. He is currently an assistant coach for Södertälje SK in Elitserien.

Career statistics

References

External links

1968 births
Baltimore Skipjacks players
Borås HC players
Frölunda HC players
Södertälje SK players
Living people
Berlin Capitals players
Luleå HF players
Malmö Redhawks players
Ice hockey people from Gothenburg
Swedish ice hockey forwards
Washington Capitals draft picks